"Love Is All Around" is a song by Swiss artist DJ BoBo, released on January 23, 1995 as the second single from his second album, There Is a Party (1994). It features vocals by singer Christiane Lupp (also known as Christiane Eiben) and reached number-one on the dance chart in Canada. In Europe, it peaked within the top 10 in Finland and Germany, being certified gold in the latter country.

Chart performance
"Love Is All Around" proved to be a major hit on the charts in Europe, Canada and Australia. In Europe, it reached the top 10 in both Finland and Germany, peaking at number seven and ten, respectively. The single was also a top 20 hit in Austria, Belgium, Denmark, Norway, Spain, Sweden and Switzerland, as well as on the Eurochart Hot 100, where it hit number 17 in February 1995. In the United Kingdom, it was one of only three songs by DJ BoBo to chart there, peaking at number 49 in its first week on the UK Singles Chart, on June 11, 1995. However, on the UK Dance Singles Chart, "Love Is All Around" was a bigger hit, reaching number 20. Outside Europe, it peaked at number-one on the RPM Dance/Urban chart in Canada and number 24 in Australia. The single earned a gold record in Germany, with a sale of 150,000 units, and a platinum record in Switzerland, after 30,000 singles were sold there.

Critical reception
Pan-European magazine Music & Media commented, "Hard to distinguish from other Euro tracks, DJ Bobo apparently prefers to hold the most different tracks from his There's a Party album for a later release on single." James Hamilton from British magazine Music Weeks RM Dance Update described it as "Swiss DJ Rene Bobo Baumann's drily muttered and girls chorused cheesily galloping Euro hit (not the Troggs/Wet Wet Wet song)". 

Music video
A music video was made for "Love Is All Around", directed by Frank Paul Husmann (as 'Husmann & Husmann') and has a sepia tone. It was filmed in New York City, depicting a story around DJ BoBo and his girlfriend intertwined with footage of various people on the streets of the city. The video was later published on DJ BoBo's official YouTube channel in January 2013 and by September 2021, it had more than 34 million views.

Track listing
 CD maxi - Europe'
 "Love Is All Around" (Radio Version) - 4:04
 "Love Is All Around" (Extended Mix I)	- 5:29
 "Bring the Beat Back"	- 4:39
 "Love Is All Around" (Extended Mix II) - 5:06

Charts and certifications

Weekly charts

Year-end charts

Certifications

References

1995 songs
1995 singles
DJ BoBo songs
Music videos directed by Frank Paul Husmann
Number-one singles in Canada
Songs written by Axel Breitung
Songs written by DJ BoBo